Assassin is a 1973 British thriller film directed by Peter Crane and starring Ian Hendry, Edward Judd and Frank Windsor.

Premise
The British government hires an assassin to kill a Ministry of Defence official suspected of leaking secrets.

Cast
 Ian Hendry as The Assassin 
 Edward Judd as MI5 Control 
 Frank Windsor as John Stacy 
 Ray Brooks as Edward Craig 
 John Hart Dyke as Janik 
 Verna Harvey as The Girl 
 Mike Pratt as Matthew 
 Frank Duncan as Luke 
 Mike Shannon as Alcoholic 
 Paul Whitsun-Jones as Drunk Man 
 Molly Weir as Drunk Woman 
 Andrew Lodge as Back-up Man 
 Avril Fenton as Barmaid
 Caroline John as Ann
 Celia Imrie as Stacy's Secretary

References

External links
 

1973 films
1970s thriller films
1970s English-language films
Films directed by Peter Crane
British thriller films
1970s British films